State Center / Cultural Center station is an underground Metro SubwayLink station in Baltimore, Maryland. It is a transit hub offering connections to Light RailLink, the tenth most northern and western station on the line, the first one in the area viewed by many as "downtown Baltimore," and is within a 2 block walk of the Cultural Center / State Center station on the Baltimore Light Rail via Preston Street, and many area landmarks.

The stations elevator and escalator entrance is located on the corner of West Preston Street and North Eutaw Street which is directly adjacent to the Maryland States Office Complex, hence the name "State Center." It is within the boundaries of the Madison Park neighborhood and is also very close to the adjacent neighborhoods of Bolton Hill, Mid-Town Belvedere, Mount Vernon, and Seton Hill.

Station layout

Artwork

State Center station features a mobile sculpture entitled "Venter," which is suspended in a large opening between its upper and lower level. The sculpture was created by Baltimore artist Paul Daniel at a $39,000 commission in 1983.

History

State Center station was initially referred to as the Bolton Hill station during its planning and construction, in reference to the adjacent neighborhood to the site's north.

Excavation and construction

The Bolton Hill tunnels constructed around State Center station were driven with a shield through Cretaceous alluvium and through mica schist-derived residual materials. Hand mining was required to advance the face of the tunnel in some areas where the alignment passed through more resistant, hard residual materials.

References

External links

Preston Street entrance from Google Maps Street View

Transit-oriented developments in the United States
Metro SubwayLink stations
Railway stations in the United States opened in 1983
1983 establishments in Maryland
Railway stations in Baltimore
Madison Park, Baltimore
Bolton Hill, Baltimore